Ryan Clifford McGill (born February 28, 1969) is a Canadian former professional ice hockey player, and current assistant coach with the New Jersey Devils of the National Hockey League (NHL). He played in the 151 games in the NHL with the Chicago Blackhawks, Philadelphia Flyers, and Edmonton Oilers between 1991 and 1995. McGill's playing career ended prematurely as a result of an eye injury.

Playing career
McGill is a native of Sherwood Park, Alberta. A second-round draft choice of the Chicago Blackhawks in the 1987 NHL Draft, he played a total of 151 career NHL games over a seven-year career with the Blackhawks, Philadelphia Flyers and Edmonton Oilers. His professional playing career also included the American Hockey League and International Hockey League. As a player in the Blackhawks development system, he was a member of the 1990 Turner Cup Champions which was then coached by Darryl Sutter.

As an Edmonton Oiler, McGill was struck in the left eye by a puck and was declared legally blind in that eye. He was forced into early retirement at the age of 26.

Coaching career
McGill served as an assistant coach for the Edmonton Ice in the Western Hockey League during the 1996–97 season. When the team began the 1997–98 season with nine losses and one tie, head Dave Siciliano was fired on October 24, 1997, and replaced by McGill.

McGill coached 350 games in the Western Hockey League, capping it off by steering the Kootenay Ice to the 2001–02 Memorial Cup title, the championship of all Canadian Major Junior hockey.

He guided the Hartford Wolf Pack (New York Rangers AHL affiliate) team to the 2003–04 regular season Eastern Conference title, tying for first place overall with a 44–24–12–2 mark for 102 points. That year, his team fell short of a trip to the Calder Cup Finals, losing in the Eastern Conference Finals to the Wilkes-Barre/Scranton Penguins.

McGill joined the Calgary Flames as an assistant coach in June 2009 after four seasons as the head coach for the Flames AHL primary affiliate team in Quad City and Omaha.

He was named head coach of the WHL's Kootenay Ice on July 4, 2012. On July 28, 2015, he was named head coach of the OHL's Owen Sound Attack. He was awarded the Matt Leyden Trophy as OHL Coach of the Year in April 2017. McGill stepped down as head coach in June 2017 to become an assistant head coach for the NHL expansion team, the Vegas Golden Knights.

On June 29, 2017, he was named an assistant coach with the Vegas Golden Knights. He was fired by the Vegas Golden Knights.

On July 29, 2022, McGill was named an assistant coach with the New Jersey Devils.

Career statistics

Regular season and playoffs

References

External links
 

1969 births
Living people
Calgary Flames coaches
Canadian ice hockey coaches
Canadian ice hockey defencemen
Chicago Blackhawks draft picks
Chicago Blackhawks players
Edmonton Ice coaches
Edmonton Oilers players
Halifax Citadels players
Hershey Bears players
Indianapolis Ice players
Kootenay Ice coaches
Lethbridge Broncos players
Medicine Hat Tigers players
New Jersey Devils coaches
Owen Sound Attack coaches
People from Sherwood Park
Philadelphia Flyers players
Saginaw Hawks players
Swift Current Broncos players
Vegas Golden Knights coaches